Edmundson may refer to:

People

Surname
 Garry Edmundson (1932–2016), Canadian, retired professional ice hockey player
 Hec Edmundson (1886–1964), American basketball coach
 Helen Edmundson (born 1964), British playwright
 Henry A. Edmundson (1814–1890), American politician
 Jóan Símun Edmundsson (born 1991), Faroese footballer
 Joel Edmundson (born 1993), Canadian ice hockey player
 John Edmundson, American, USN, chief medical doctor at the Guantanamo Bay detainment camps in Cuba
 Olive Edmundson (1881–1972), British horticulturalist
 Sarah Emma Edmundson (1841–1898), Canadian-born woman who served as a soldier (disguised as a man) in the Union Army during the American Civil War

Given name
 Sherry Edmundson Fry (1879–1966), American sculptor
 Edmundson Parkes (1904–1997), President and CEO of United Gas Corporation

Other
 Edmundson, Missouri, a US city
Hec Edmundson Pavilion, an indoor arena on the campus of University of Washington

See also
 Edmondson (disambiguation)
 Edmondston, a surname
 Edmunds (disambiguation)

Patronymic surnames
Surnames from given names